The 2017–18 Serie D was the seventieth edition of the top level Italian non-professional football championship. It represents the fourth tier in the Italian football league system. A total of 167 teams, divided on geographical grounds into 6 groups of 18 teams each, one of 19 teams and 2 of 20 teams.

Girone A

League table

Girone B

League table

Girone C

League table

Girone D

League table

Girone E

League table

Girone F

League table

Girone G

League table

Girone H

League table

Girone I

League table

Scudetto Serie D
The nine group winners enter a tournament which determines the overall Serie D champions and the winner is awarded the Scudetto Serie D.

First round
division winners placed into 3 groups of 3
group winners and best second-placed team qualify for semi-finals
rank in Discipline Cup and head-to-head will break a tie or ties in points for the top position in a group

Semi-finals
On neutral ground.

Final
On neutral ground.

Scudetto winners: Pro Patria

Promotions
The nine group winners are automatically promoted to Serie C. Vibonese was promoted after defeating Troina in a promotion playoff after penalties, as the two teams ended the Girone I'' on level points. On 3 August 2018, it was officially announced by the Italian Football Federation (FIGC) that Cavese and Imolese were admitted to Serie C to fill the vacancies created by teams that withdrew. Como 1907's request to move up to Serie C was rejected due to its failure to present two required financial guarantees.

References

4
Serie D seasons
Italy